Toni Gae Severin is a New Zealand politician who became a Member of Parliament in the New Zealand parliament at the 2020 general election as a representative of the ACT New Zealand party.

Early life and career
Toni Severin is resident in the Christchurch East electorate. Severin is a business owner, and previously spent 14 years as a laboratory technician for Canterbury District Health Board.

Political career

Severin unsuccessfully contested four elections for ACT before finally being elected a member of Parliament.

In the 2008, 2011 and 2014 elections, she was selected for Christchurch Central. Her party list placement in 2008 was 54th and she placed sixth of nine candidates in the electorate. In 2011, she was ranked 17th on the party list and finished last of six electorate candidates. In 2014, she was placed 11th on the party list and came sixth of eight candidates.

Severin transferred to Christchurch East for the 2017 general election and was placed 10th on the ACT party list. She was last out of the seven candidates.

In the 2020 general election, Severin contested Christchurch East for a second time. She finished fourth of nine candidates, but ACT won 7.6% of the party vote. This entitled it to 10 MPs, including Severin. She is ACT's spokesperson for ACC and Corrections, is a member of the Regulations Review committee and is a former member of the Health committee.

Political views 
Severin is a licensed gun owner and believes the gun control laws passed after the Christchurch mosque attack was rushed and would not have prevented the attack. 
Severin delayed receiving her COVID-19 vaccination after seeking medical advice due to a pre-existing condition.

Personal life
Severin runs a business in Christchurch with her husband, with branches in Auckland and Wellington. The Companies Register shows her as director and shareholder of Vess 2013, a residential rental company, and Jet-X Wellington, which steam-cleans building exteriors. A third company, Unique Links NZ, a jewellery wholesaling company, is in the process of being removed from the Companies Register for failing to file an annual return.

References

Living people
ACT New Zealand MPs
Members of the New Zealand House of Representatives
New Zealand list MPs
Women members of the New Zealand House of Representatives
21st-century New Zealand politicians
21st-century New Zealand women politicians
Year of birth missing (living people)
Unsuccessful candidates in the 2008 New Zealand general election
Unsuccessful candidates in the 2011 New Zealand general election
Unsuccessful candidates in the 2014 New Zealand general election
Unsuccessful candidates in the 2017 New Zealand general election
Candidates in the 2020 New Zealand general election